Typhoon Nelson can refer to these two typhoons in the Eastern Pacific:
 Typhoon Nelson (1982), the second tropical cyclone to strike the Philippines within a week in March 1982
 Typhoon Nelson (1985), the worst tropical cyclone to affect Southern China in 16 years
 Typhoon Nelson (1988), a super typhoon